Snow rugby refers to forms of rugby union that are especially adapted to be played in winter conditions, particularly in deep snow. It is played in Canada, the Kashmir region in India, the Baltic states, Russia, the northern United States, and Finland. Specific locations of play include the Argentinian Ski Resort of Las Leñas and the Boitsfort Rugby Club in Brussels.

Because of the cold, and often subzero, temperatures at which snow rugby is played, players must dress warmly.

History
Rugby union is predominantly played during the winter months and it has been played in extremely cold conditions. More recently games have been organised to be played in the snow. In 2009, Gulmarg hosted India's first ever snow rugby tournament in Kashmir and it was included in the 2008 Indian Winter Games as a demonstrative event. During the 2011 Rugby World Cup Mount Dobson hosted a "20 Below Rugby in the Snow" seven-a-side tournament. Tournaments have also been held in Finland, France, Latvia, and Argentina.

The first European Championships were held in Moscow from 21 to 22 November 2019. Eight teams of each sex took part in it.

Rugby Europe Snow Rugby European Championship

Men

Women

See also
 Beach rugby, a form designed to be played on sand.
 Snow golf

References

Variations of rugby union
Snow sports